In scheduled transportation, a layover (also waypoint, way station, or connection) is a point where a vehicle stops, with passengers possibly changing vehicles. In public transit, this typically takes a few minutes at a trip terminal. For air travel, where layovers are longer, passengers will exit the vehicle and wait in the terminal, often to board another vehicle traveling elsewhere.

A stopover is a longer form of layover, allowing time to leave the transport system for sightseeing or overnight accommodation.

History

Historically, a way station was a facility for resting or changing a team of horses drawing a stagecoach. Typically a simple meal was available to passengers, who were also able to use restrooms. Basic overnight accommodations were sometimes available in remote instances.

Mass transit
A layover for mass transit allows a short period of recovery time built into the schedule. Layovers are generally used for one or more of the following reasons: recover from delays, provide breaks for the driver, and/or allow time for a driver change. Delays may be caused by earlier traffic congestion or excess boarding times.

In addition to being used at the end of vehicle trip, layovers can be scheduled at timing points during the trip, in which case they are often referred to as loading/unloading time. In this case, they serve as extra time provided for the loading and unloading of passengers, which is most often scheduled at busy stops. They also allow time to pass if a service is running early, to prevent arriving at a timing point ahead of schedule.

Long-distance rail and bus
A layover in long-distance travel by train or intercity bus is a break that a passenger must take between vehicles in a multi-vehicle trip. It is the time spent at a terminal after leaving one vehicle and waiting to board the next. Many inter-city and international trips include layovers.

As in mass transit, a layover in long-distance travel may provide for a break taken by the operator. A vehicle is said to be laying over after it finishes its route and is waiting prior to a return trip, or is taking a break to change crews or for the crew to rest.

Air
In air travel, a stop or transfer (from one airplane to another) is considered to be a layover or connection up to a certain maximum allowed connecting time, while a so-called stopover is a substantially longer break in the flight itinerary. The maximum time depends on many variables, but for most U.S. and Canadian itineraries, it is 4 hours, and for most international itineraries (including any domestic stops), it is 24 hours. In general, layovers are cheaper than stopovers, because notionally layovers are incidental to traveling between two other points, whereas stopovers are among the traveler's destinations.

See also

Bus terminus
Transport hub
Stage station

References

Transportation planning
Airline tickets
Scheduling (transportation)